= Yu Sun-ha =

South Korean novelist

Yu Sun-ha (Korean: 유순하; born 1943) is a South Korean novelist. He made his literary debut in 1968 and became critically ill in 1985 due to unexplainable causes. Since the life-changing event, Yu has been active in his literary pursuit. His novels shed light on entities that are in conflict, such as men and women, capitalists and workers, Korea and Japan. He strives to depict, from a balanced point of view, issues facing humans in such conflicting relationships.

== Life ==
Yu Sun-ha was born in Kyoto, Japan in 1943, and his family moved to Korea when he was three. Naturally averse to institutional settings, he had very little formal schooling. He attended elementary school only for three years and high school for a few months. Later, Yu took and passed a middle school qualification exam to attend high school in Daejeon, but he was absent for more than 100 days a year and barely graduated thanks to efforts by his homeroom teacher. After graduation, he worked for the Chungju Fertilizer Manufacturing Plant before fulfilling his mandatory military service. After discharge, recalling what Novelist Yi Kwang-su once said (“Anyone can be a writer after completing 10,000 pieces of squared manuscript paper.”), Yu bought 5,000 pieces of squared manuscript paper and began to write. Then in 1968, he was awarded a New Writer's Award from Sasanggye for a one-act play entitled Inganiramyeon nuguna (인간이라면 누구나 Anyone If You Are a Human). However, due to political situations of the time, the play was canceled, which made him skeptical and unable to write for more than a decade.

Yu resumed his writing in 1980 when he received an award from Hankook Munhak for his novel Heomangui pian (허망의 피안 Nirvana of Falsehood). However, he did not write many works, feeling shy about showing his works to the world. Then an unexplainable critical illness brought him to the verge of death, which, in turn, completely changed his attitude toward literature. In 1985, he fell into a coma and a Catholic priest even recited a prayer for the dying as it was thought that death was near for him. However, Yun miraculously survived. This near-death experience made him think, “I need to write what’s on my mind as fast as possible because I don’t know when I am going to die.” and desperately work on writing novels. Over the three-year period after the illness, he wrote 9,000 pages of squared manuscript paper. Yu has since published more than 30 books of diverse genres, including full-length novels, short story collections, essay collections, and children's books. He has also received numerous awards, most notably an Isan Literature Prize and a Kim Yu-Jeong Literary Award.

== Writing ==
=== Main themes ===
Known to be a prolific writer, Yu Sun-ha has steadily written works filled with social criticism. He focuses on entities in mutual conflict, such as men and women, capitalists and workers, yangban (traditional ruling class in Joseon) and pyeongmin (commoners), Korea and Japan. From a balanced perspective, he aims to illustrate issues facing humans in such conflicting relationships.

His first short story collection Naega geurin nae eolgul hana (내가 그린 내 얼굴 하나 My Face I Painted) (1988) deals with the relations between Korea and its neighboring countries. Here, the neighboring countries mean powerful nations from the past (e.g. China's Tang dynasty) and the present (e.g. Japan and the U.S.A.) The short story series “Gogung” (고궁 Old Palaces) explores both historical and current relationships between Korea and Japan, in the case of “Gogung―Gyeongbokgung” (고궁―경복궁 Old Palace―Gyeongbokgung Palace) from a Japanese person's perspective and in the case of “Gogung―Osakaseong” (고궁―오사카성 Old Palace―Osaka Castle) from a Korean person's perspective. These works show his aspiration to relinquish Korea's subjugated economic and cultural relationships with powerful countries. Yet, his literary focus goes beyond international relationships. What Yu delves into more deeply is the Korean people's internalized coloniality. He strongly criticizes Korean people's blind worship and antagonism as symptoms of their internalized coloniality.

Yu's most reputed work is his first full-length novel Saengseong (생성 Formation) (1988). Inspired by the June Democracy Movement in 1987, the novel depicts a three-day labor strike happening in late August, 1987 at one kitchenware company. What's notable about the novel is the fact that it portrays, from a balanced perspective, how three distinct groups of capitalists, middle managers, and laborers react over the course of the strike, and the fact that it pays attention to the role of a middle manager as a mediator. In particular, Sin Jong-taek, a middle manager, strives to maintain an objective point of view between the CEO and the laborers, believing that there is no absolute good or absolute evil. It is said that Sin's ideas most closely embody the novelist's worldview. In fact, Yu himself had worked, until the late 1980s, as a middle manager, a middleman between the management and the union, at a company called the Union Gas. The novel, however, received negative reviews because the dialogues tend to be overly abstract and dogmatic, thereby losing tension, and because the novel suggests solutions to the conflict between management and workers that are too moralistic and lacking in reality.

=== Socio-cultural criticism ===
In addition to novels, Yu has published a number of socio-cultural criticisms. His criticism books, whose subtitles begin with “A Dreamer’s …,” cover a wide array of topics ranging from Korea's corporate economy and politics to the feminism movement and foreign affairs. These critical works include Han mongsanggaui yeojaron (한 몽상가의 여자론 A Dreamer's Discourse on Women) (1994), Samseong singyeongyeong daehaebu : Han mongsanggaui gieomnon (삼성 신경영 대해부 : 한 몽상가의 기업론 A Deep Analysis on Samsung's New Management: A Dreamer's Discourse on Corporations) (1995), Chamdoen peminijeumeul wihan seongchal : Han mongsanggaui peminijeumnon (참된 페미니즘을 위한 성찰 : 한 몽상가의 페미니즘론 An Introspection for True Feminism: A Dreamer's Discourse on Feminism) (1996),

Dangsindeurui ilbon : Han mongsanggaui cheheomjeok hanil bigyo munhwaron (당신들의 일본 : 한 몽상가의 체험적 한일 비교 문화론 Your Japan: A Dreamer's Comparative Cultural Discourse on Japan Based on Personal Experience) (2014). These criticisms were originally received favorably as they provide in-depth social analysis based on everyday experiences. However, in the 1990s, they were sharply criticized from women's organizations for their pointed criticism of the feminist movement.

=== Children's stories ===
With a personal goal of promoting children's literature in Korea, Yu has published several children's books. Goyanginim, annyeong! (고양이님, 안녕! Hello, Mr. Cat!) is based on conversations Yu, under the nickname “Mr. Cat,” had for about a year on his grandchildren's blog. This work received critical attention for its experimental structure and its original and stylish language.

== Works ==
=== Short story collections ===
- 《내가 그린 내 얼굴 하나》, 민음사, 1988 / Naega geurin nae eolgul hana (My Face I Painted), Minumsa, 1988
- 《새 무덤 하나》, 풀빛, 1989 / Sae mudeom hana (A New Grave), Pulbit, 1989
- 《벙어리 누에》, 문학과지성사, 1990 / Beongeori nue (The Dumb Silkworm), Munji, 1990
- 《우물안 개구리》, 현암사, 1991 / Umuran gaeguri (The Frog in the Well), Hyeonamsa, 1991
- 《다섯 번째 화살》, 세계사, 1992 / Daseot beonjjae hwasal (The Fifth Arrow), Segyesa, 1991
- 《무서운 세상》, 강, 1998 / Museoun sesang (A Scary World), Gang, 1998
- 《바보아재》, 실천문학사, 2014 / Baboajae (The Idiot Uncle), Silcheonmunhaksa, 2014

=== Novels ===
- 《생성》, 풀빛, 1988 / Saengseong (Formation), Pulbit, 1988
- 《하회사람들》, 고려원, 1988 / Hahoesaramdeul (People in the Hahoe Village), Goryeowon, 1988
- 《낮달》, 풀빛, 1989 / Natdal (The Daytime Moon), Pulbit, 1989
- 《배반》, 열음사, 1990 / Baeban (Betrayal), Yeoleumsa, 1990
- 《91학번》, 민족과문학사, 1992 / Guilhakbeon (The Class of ’91), Minjokgwamunhaksa, 1992
- 《고독》, 세계사, 1992 / Godok (Loneliness), Segyesa, 1992
- 《여자는 슬프다》, 민음사, 1994 / Yeojaneun seulpeuda (Women Are Sad), Minumsa, 1994
- 《산 너머 강》, 고려원, 1994 / San neomeo gang (The River beyond the Mountain), Goryeowon, 1994
- 《희망의 혁명》, 열린세상, 1994 / Huimangui hyeongmyeong (The Revolution of Hope), Yeollinsesang, 1994
- 《아주 먼 길》, 문학과지성사, 1995 / Aju meon gil (A Road Too Far), Munji, 1995
- 《대통령》, 실천문학사, 1998 / Daetongnyeong (The President), Silcheonmunhaksa, 1998
- 《멍에》, 문이당, 2007 / Meonge (Yoke), Munidang, 2007
- 《길 밖의 길》, 책세상, 2008 / Gil bakkui gil (A Road outside the Road), Chaeksesang, 2007

=== Criticism collections ===
- 《한 몽상가의 여자론》, 문예출판사, 1994 / Han mongsanggaui yeojaron (A Dreamer's Discourse on Women), Moonye, 1994
- 《삼성 신경영 대해부 : 한 몽상가의 기업론》, 고려원, 1995 / Samseong singyeongyeong daehaebu : Han mongsanggaui gieomnon (A Deep Analysis on Samsung's New Management: A Dreamer's Discourse on Corporations), Goryeowon, 1995
- 《삼성, 신화는 없다 : 한 몽상가의 기업론》, 고려원, 1995 / Samseong, sinhwaneun eopda : Han mongsanggaui gieomnon (Samsung Is Not a Legend: A Dreamer's Discourse on Corporations), Goryeowon, 1995
- 《한국 정치판의 시계는 지금 몇 시인가》, 문이당, 1995 / Hangung jeongchipanui sigyeneun jigeum myeon siinga (What Time Is It on the Clock of Korean Politics?), Munidang, 1995
- 《삼성의 새로운 위기》, 계몽사, 1996 / Samseongui saeroun wigi (Samsung's New Crisis), Kyemongsa, 1996
- 《참된 페미니즘을 위한 성찰 : 한 몽상가의 페미니즘론》, 문이당, 1996 / Chamdoen peminijeumeul wihan seongchal : Han mongsanggaui peminijeumnon (An Introspection for True Feminism: A Dreamer's Discourse on Feminism), Munidang, 1996
- 《한국 문화에 대한 체험적 의문 99 : 한 몽상가의 문화론》, 한울, 1998 / Hangung munhwae daehan cheheomjeong uimun 99 : han mongsanggaui munhwaron (99 Personal Experience-Based Questions on Korean Culture: A Dreamer's Discourse on Culture), Hanul, 1998
- 《당신들의 일본 : 한 몽상가의 체험적 한일 비교 문화론》, 문이당, 2014 / Dangsindeurui ilbon : han mongsanggaui cheheomjeong hanil bigyo munhwaron (Your Japan: A Dreamer's Comparative Cultural Discourse on Japan Based on Personal Experience), Munidang, 2014
- 《사자, 포효하다》, 문이당, 2015 / Saja, pohyohada (The Lion That Roars), Munidang, 2015
- 《부모가 바뀌면 자식이 산다》, 문이당, 2015 / Bumoga bakkwimyeon jasigi sanda (New Parents Give New Life to Children), Munidang, 2015

=== Children's stories ===
- 《힘내라 동서남북》, 세계사, 1990 / Himnaera dongseonambuk (Cheer Up! North South East and West), Segyesa, 1990
- 《동수의 세 번째 비밀》, 산하, 1991 / Dongsuui se beonjjae bimil (The Third Secret of Dongsu), Sanha, 1991
- 《노란 나비의 빨간 눈》, 문이당, 2007 / Noran nabiui ppalgan nun (The Red Eyes of the Yellow Butterfly), Munidang, 2007
- 《고양이님, 안녕!》, 산하, 2016 / Goyanginim, annyeong! (Hello, Mr. Cat!), Sanha, 2016

== Awards ==
- Sasanggye New Author Literary Prize (1968) for the play Inganiramyeon nuguna
- Korean Literature New Writer's Award (1980) for Heomangui pian
- Adongmunye New Writer's Award (아동문예 신인상, 1986) for Sigan eunhaeng
- Ilbung Literature Prize (일붕문학상, 1988) for Naega geurin nae eolgul hana
- Isan Literature Prize (1989) for Saengseong
- Kim Yu-Jeong Literary Award (1991) for Han jayujuuijaui siljong
- EBS Radio Literature Prize (EBS라디오문학상, 2013) for Baboajae
